Thomas Ervin Valentine (October 21, 1949 – July 12, 2014) was an American professional golfer.

College
Born in Atlanta, Georgia, Valentine was a four-year letterman in golf for the University of Georgia team from 1968 to 1971, winning the Southeastern Conference  (SEC) individual title in 1970, and helping Georgia win the SEC championship in 1969, 1970, and 1971.  He was first team NCAA All-American in 1970.

Professional career
Valentine competed on the PGA Tour from 1977 until 1988, earning over $300,000 during his career, which included 14 top-10 finishes. Valentine's best finish was a second to Tom Watson in the 1981 Atlanta Classic. Valentine and Watson were tied at the end of 72 holes, and Watson won the sudden-death playoff.

Later years
After leaving the PGA Tour in 1988, Valentine accepted the position of head pro at the Lochmoor Club in Grosse Pointe Woods, Michigan, which he held until his retirement in 2009.

Valentine died on July 12, 2014, following a long battle with cancer.  He was 64.

Playoff record
PGA Tour playoff record (0–1)

See also
Spring 1977 PGA Tour Qualifying School graduates
Fall 1978 PGA Tour Qualifying School graduates
1983 PGA Tour Qualifying School graduates

References

External links

American male golfers
Georgia Bulldogs men's golfers
PGA Tour golfers
Golfers from Atlanta
Golfers from Michigan
Sportspeople from Metro Detroit
People from Grosse Pointe Shores, Michigan
Deaths from cancer in Georgia (U.S. state)
1949 births
2014 deaths